Thiotricha coleella is a moth of the family Gelechiidae. It was described by Constant in 1885. It is found in the Alpes-Maritimes in southern France.

References

Moths described in 1885
Thiotricha